Stara maslina (Montenegrin Cyrillic: Стара маслина) is one of the world's oldest olive trees, located near Stari Bar (City of Bar) in Montenegro. The tree is said to be over 2,000 years old. It is a popular tourist attraction in the country.

A side of the tree is completely burnt. According to popular folklore, a few men were playing cards next to the tree. During their game, one member accidentally threw a lit match onto the tree, and it soon went up in flames.

See also
 List of individual trees
 List of oldest trees

External links
 Turisticka organizacija Bara - Stara maslina, 2009-04-13

Tourist attractions in Montenegro
Individual olive trees
Individual trees in Montenegro
Oldest trees